Peter Drummond (1850–1918) was a Scottish Locomotive Superintendent with the Highland Railway from 1896 to 1911 and with the Glasgow and South Western Railway from 1912 to 1918. He was the younger brother of the engineer Dugald Drummond.

Locomotives
Locomotives designed by Peter Drummond include:
Highland Railway Drummond 0-6-0 Class goods engine
Highland Railway Drummond 0-6-4T Class banking engine
Highland Railway L Class 4-4-0 passenger engine
Highland Railway Ben Class 4-4-0 passenger engine
G&SWR 'Austrian Goods' 2-6-0

References

 

 
 
 

1850 births
1918 deaths
British mechanical engineers
Locomotive builders and designers
Glasgow and South Western Railway people